Seagrave Fire Apparatus LLC is an American fire apparatus manufacturer that specializes in pumper and rescue units, as well as aerial towers. In addition to manufacturing new equipment, they refurbish, repair and upgrade older Seagrave apparatus, including National Fire Protection Association updates to equipment. Seagrave operates manufacturing facilities in Clintonville, Wisconsin, and Rock Hill, South Carolina, and is an authorized General Services Administration vendor and supplies the federal government of the United States with firefighting equipment.

History 
Seagrave was founded in Detroit, Michigan, in 1881 by Fredric Seagrave and moved to Columbus, Ohio, in 1891. Seagrave was acquired by the FWD Corporation in 1963 and moved their corporate headquarters to Clintonville, Wisconsin.

Randolph Lenz, Chair of FWD's parent company, Corsta Corp., became embroiled in a Federal Deposit Insurance Corporation suit and in 2003 all assets of FWD, including FWD Corporation, Seagrave, Baker Aerialscope and Almonte Fire Trucks, were sold to an investment group headed by former American LaFrance executive James Hebe.

Today, the Seagrave group is a flagship company of ELB Capital Management.

Canadian operations
Around 1900, Seagrave opened a Canadian plant and subsequently sold a full range of apparatus until 1936. Entering into an alliance with well-known Canadian fire engine builder R. S. Bickle Co "Canadianized" versions of standard Seagrave rigs were assembled at Bickle's Woodstock, Ontario, plant, and sold under the Bickle-Seagrave banner. After several ownership changes, and closure in 1956, Bickle's successor King-Seagrave Ltd. continued to assemble Seagrave fire apparatus until 1973, when FWD Corp opted not to renew its agreement. King continued to produce fire apparatus on commercial chassises until its closure in 1985.

Seagrave purchased Canadian apparatus builder Almonte Fire Trucks of Carleton Place, Ontario, in 1999. The Carleton Place plant built commercial chassis apparatus and served the Canadian market. Production ceased in 2010 and the building was sold to Eastway Emergency Vehicles.

Products

Chassis
Capitol Full-tilt cab - Current Chassis Design
Marauder II Full-tilt cab - Current Chassis Design
Attacker HD Split-tilt cab - Current Chassis Design
Commercial - Current Chassis Design
Grizzly APC - Current Chassis Design
Marauder - Out of Production
Concorde - Out of Production
Commander II - Out of Production
Commander - Out of Production
Flame - Out of Production

Fire apparatus

Fire Engines
Custom Pumper
Commercial Pumper
Commercial Quick Attack Pumper
Custom Pumper Tanker
Commercial Pumper Tanker
Custom Rescue Pumper
Commercial Rescue Pumper
Fire Trucks
Apollo II 105' Rear-Mount Platform Tower Ladder
Aerialscope II 75' Mid Mount Tower Ladder
Aerialscope II 95' Mid Mount Tower Ladder
Force Aerial Ladder
Meanstick Quint 500lb tip load
Tractor Drawn Aerial Ladder
Patriot ladder 100' 250lb tip load
TowerMax Rear Mount Platform Tower Ladder (Out of Production)
TowerMax Mid Mount Platform Tower Ladder (Out of Production)
Apollo Rear Mount Platform Tower Ladder (Out of Production)
Tankers
Custom Tanker
Commercial Tanker
Rescues
Specialist Rescue/HazMat

References

External links
 Seagrave Fire Apparatus

Emergency services equipment makers
Truck manufacturers of the United States
Motor vehicle manufacturers based in Wisconsin
Manufacturing companies based in Wisconsin
Companies based in Wisconsin